Eduardo Octavio Trejos Lalli (San José, Costa Rica, December 15, 1972) is a Costa Rican internationalist, private consultant and politician. Trejos is the current Costa Rican representative in the Central American Bank for Economic Integration. Trejos was also Director of National Intelligence and Security and has held the position of Deputy Foreign Minister, interim Foreign Minister and Ambassador of Costa Rica to Nicaragua

Life and career

Trejos is the son of Alfonso Trejos Willis (Costa Rican) and Susana Lalli Giménez (Argentine), Trejos was born in San José, Costa Rica. Trejos studied International Relations with specialization in foreign trade.

Trejos served as an independent consultant and parliamentary adviser. He joined the Foreign Ministry as advisor to the Vice Minister in the 1998–2000 period where he served as Foreign Policy Director, where he also served as liaison with the Legislative Assembly of Costa Rica and in the trade talks with the European Union. Between 2000 and 2002, he moved to the Ministry of Tourism, where he was chief of staff at the minister's office.

In 2003 he was in charge of negotiation between Costa Rica and Nicaragua for the Procuenca del Río San Juan Project and as a researcher of the Program of High Public Management of INCAE in 2004. He joined the Citizens' Action Party in 2005 and served as an advisor in Deputy Ruth Montoya Rojas' office. Later, he was Director of Advisors for the Citizen Action Party's bench and a principal advisor to the group's spokesperson. Between 2010 and 2014, he was an independent consultant for the Information and Knowledge Society Program (PROSIC) of the Universidad de Costa Rica, the Inter-American Development Bank and the Institute of Development Studies.

Trejos was appointed administrative Vice Minister in the Ministry of Foreign Affairs since May 8, 2014 during the Solís Rivera administration. During his tenure as interim chancellor, he was responsible for leading the III Summit of CELAC hosted by Costa Rica.

He assumes the position of Costa Rican ambassador in Managua, Nicaragua, as of June 8, 2016 after the previous holder, Javier Sancho Bonilla, retired. In addition to streamlining visa delivery processes at the Nicaraguan consulate, through the implementation of a prior appointment process, Trejos promoted trade and tourism exchange among the two nations. Trejos was appointed Director of the Intelligence and Security Directorate of Costa Rica in the administration of Carlos Alvarado Quesada. This is the intelligence agency of Costa Rica.

Trejos has also served as professor of theory of the state and international affairs at the Universidad Latina de Costa Rica.

References

1972 births
Ambassadors of Costa Rica
Citizens' Action Party (Costa Rica) politicians
Costa Rican academics
Costa Rican people of Argentine descent
Directors of intelligence agencies
Government ministers of Costa Rica
University of Costa Rica alumni
Living people
People from San José, Costa Rica